The following is about the qualification system and qualified countries for the Canoeing at the 2023 Pan American Games competition to be held in Santiago, Chile. The canoeing competitions will be held in Los Andes (slalom) and San Pedro de la Paz (sprint).

Qualification system
A total of 176 canoe and kayak athletes will qualify to compete. 126 will qualify in sprint (63 per gender) + four winners from the 2021 Junior Pan American Games and 46 in canoe slalom (23 per gender). The host nation (Chile) is guaranteed a boat in each event in the sprint discipline and in slalom (except the extreme events), however it must compete in the respective qualification tournaments.

Qualification timeline

Qualification summary

Slalom
A total of 36 canoe slalom athletes (18 per gender) will qualify, along with 10 in extreme canoe slalom (five per gender). All qualification will be done at the 2023 Pan American Canoe Slalom Championships. A nation can qualify a maximum of one athlete per event, meaning a nation can enter a maximum of six athletes (three men and three women). All athletes qualified in canoe slalom can contest the extreme event. A wild card quota is available for an each gender in a canoe slalom event, only if they have competed at the 2023 Pan American Championships.

Qualification table

Sprint
The top six boats in the kayak events and top seven in the canoe events at the 2022 Pan American Championships qualify for the games. An athlete can qualify in only one boat, and if they compete in multiple events at the qualifier, their results are not counted in the smaller boat(s). The larger boats are awarded first, followed by the smaller ones, with all countries qualifying in the larger boats required to compete in any smaller boat(s) at the games. A total of 43 kayak and 22 canoe athletes will qualify per gender.

Men's canoe

A striked out nation means athletes already qualified in a larger boat, and the quota spot went to the next nation.

Men's kayak

A striked out nation means athletes already qualified in a larger boat, and the quota spot went to the next nation.

Women's canoe

A striked out nation means athletes already qualified in a larger boat, and the quota spot went to the next nation.

Women's kayak

A striked out nation means athletes already qualified in a larger boat, and the quota spot went to the next nation.

References

2022 in canoeing
2023 in canoeing
Qualification for the 2023 Pan American Games
Canoeing at the 2023 Pan American Games